Robots: Music from the Original Motion Picture is the soundtrack of the 2005 feature film Robots. The soundtrack was issued in March 2005 by Virgin Records and Fox Music. The album also reached No. 13 on the Billboard Soundtracks chart.

Critical reception
 

Heather Phares of AllMusic noted that the soundtrack "does create a feel-good, party-time mood".

Track listing

Charts

References

Virgin Records soundtracks
2005 soundtrack albums
2000s film soundtrack albums